Cyril Raker Endfield (November 10, 1914 – April 16, 1995) was an American screenwriter, director, author, magician and inventor. Having been named as a Communist at a House Un-American Activities Committee hearing and subsequently blacklisted, he moved to the United Kingdom in 1953, where he spent the remainder of his career.

Early life
Endfield was born in Scranton, Pennsylvania, to a Jewish immigrant father whose business was hit hard by the Great Depression. He attended Yale University.

Career in the U.S.
Endfield began his career as a theatre director and drama coach, becoming a significant figure in New York's progressive theatre scene. It was largely through a shared interest in magic that Orson Welles became aware of Endfield and recruited him as an apprentice for Mercury Productions (then based at RKO Pictures). One of his independent films was Inflation (1942), a 15-minute commission for the Office of War Information that was rejected as being anti-capitalist.

The debacle surrounding the production of The Magnificent Ambersons (1942) ended with the expulsion of the Mercury team from the RKO lot. Endfield signed on as a contract director at MGM where he directed a variety of shorts (including the last films in the long-running Our Gang series), before freelancing on low-budget productions for Monogram and other independents. He served in the Army during World War II.

It was with the film noir The Underworld Story (1950), a United Artists independent production, that Endfield first received significant critical and studio attention. The film was a major leap from anything he had previously produced in regards to budget and social commentary, constituting a devastating attack on press corruption which could equally be taken as a wider attack on the McCarthyite ideology of the times. He followed this with the film often cited as his masterpiece, The Sound of Fury (aka Try And Get Me!) (1950), a lynching thriller based on a true story. Except for the lynching scene, the film was not well received by critics. It was with these two films that Endfield's signature approach to character developed, pessimistic without being uncompassionate.

Career in the United Kingdom
In 1951 Endfield was named as a Communist at a HUAC hearing. Subsequently blacklisted and without work, he moved to the United Kingdom in 1953, where, under various pseudonyms (to avoid complications with releases in the U.S.), he continued his career. He would often cast fellow blacklistees in his films, such as Lloyd Bridges and Sam Wanamaker. Three films – The Limping Man (1953), Impulse (1954), and Child in the House (1956) – list Charles de la Tour (a documentary filmmaker) as co-director because the ACT (Association of Cinematograph Technicians) insisted Endfield, who was not a full member of the union, could only direct in the UK if he had a British director on set as a standby. Hell Drivers (1957) was the first project he released under his real name and earned him his first BAFTA nomination, for Best British Screenplay. His 1961 film Mysterious Island featured special effects by Ray Harryhausen.

One of his most notable films was Zulu (1964), a war epic depicting the Battle of Rorke's Drift in the Anglo-Zulu War of the 1870s. This was followed by Sands of the Kalahari (1965) with Susannah York. After a few more independent productions he withdrew from directing films in 1971, his final film being Universal Soldier, in which he made a cameo appearance alongside Germaine Greer. In 1979 he wrote the non-fiction book Zulu Dawn, which tells the story of the disastrous Battle of Isandlwana and the events which led up to the battle. A film adaptation of the book was released that same year, co-written by Endfield and directed by Douglas Hickox.

Death

Endfield died in 1995 at the age of 80 at Shipston-on-Stour, in Warwickshire, England. His body was buried at Highgate Cemetery in London.

Legacy
Endfield is co-credited with Chris Rainey for a pocket-sized/miniature computer with a chorded keypad that allows rapid typing without a bulky single-stroke keyboard. It functions like a musical instrument by pressing combinations of keys that he called a "Microwriter" to generate a full alphanumeric character set. It is still available, as "CyKey", for PC and Palm PDA, by Endfield's former partner, Chris Rainey and Bellaire Electronics. CyKey is named after Cy Endfield.

British magician Michael Vincent credits Endfield as one of his biggest influences. The classic Cy Endfield's Entertaining Card Magic (1955), by Lewis Ganson, includes a variety of Endfield's creations in card magic.

Selected filmography
Inflation (1942) (short) – director
Radio Bugs (1944) (short) – director
Tale of a Dog (1944) (short) – director
Nostradamus IV (1944) (short) – director
The Great American Mug (1945) (short) – director
Magic on a Stick (1946) (short) – director
Our Old Car (1946) (short) – director
Joe Palooka, Champ (1946) – writer
Mr Hex (1946) – writer
Gentleman Joe Palooka (1946) – director, writer
Stork Bites Man (1947) – director, writer
Hard Boiled Mahoney (1947) – writer
Sleep, My Love (1948) – writer (uncredited)
 The Argyle Secrets (1948) – director, writer, author of original radio play
Joe Palooka in the Big Fight (1949) – director, writer
Joe Palooka in the Counterpunch (1949) – writer
 The Underworld Story (1950) – director, writer
 The Sound of Fury (1950) – director, writer (uncredited)
 Tarzan's Savage Fury (1952) – director
 The Limping Man (1953) – director
 Impulse (1954) – director, writer
Crashout (1955) – writer (uncredited)
 The Master Plan (1955) – director, writer
 The Secret (1955) – director, writer
 Child in the House (1956) – director, writer
Colonel March of Scotland Yard (1956) – director
 Hell Drivers (1957) – director, writer
Curse of the Demon (1957) – final screenplay (uncredited)
 Sea Fury (1958) – director, writer
 Jet Storm (1959) – director, writer
 Mysterious Island (1961) – director
 Zulu (1964) – director, writer, producer
 Hide and Seek (1964) – director
 Sands of the Kalahari (1965) – director, writer, producer
 De Sade (1969) – director
 Universal Soldier (1971) – director, writer
 Zulu Dawn (1979) – writer

References

External links 
 
 

American film producers
American male screenwriters
American communists
American theatre directors
Hollywood blacklist
Yale University alumni
Writers from Scranton, Pennsylvania
American people of Jewish descent
American emigrants to England
1914 births
1995 deaths
20th-century American businesspeople
Film directors from Pennsylvania
Burials at Highgate Cemetery
20th-century American male writers
20th-century American screenwriters